Live is a live album by the American rock band Alice in Chains. It was released on December 5, 2000, through Columbia Records. The live version of "Man in the Box" featured in the album was released as a single.

Overview
Live was the band's only live album other than the acoustic album Unplugged. While most of the songs on Live had been released on previous albums, "Queen of the Rodeo" had not; although, the same live performance had been released on the Music Bank box set. Live includes five songs ("Them Bones", "God Am", "Again", "A Little Bitter" and "Dam That River") from the band's final two shows with vocalist Layne Staley.

Reception
The album received generally positive reviews from most critics, with Greg Prato of AllMusic writing in his review of the album "Their detuned sound and tales from the darkside are even more sinister and gripping on the concert stage, as evidenced by this 14-track set."

Track listing

Personnel

Alice in Chains
Layne Staley – lead vocals (all tracks), rhythm guitar (track 3)
Jerry Cantrell – lead guitar (all tracks), vocals (all tracks) 
Sean Kinney – drums (all tracks)
Mike Inez – bass (tracks 3–14)
Mike Starr – bass (tracks 1–2)

Production
Compilation producer – Peter Fletcher
Tracks 1 and 10–14 mix engineered by Elliot Bailey and mixed by Toby Wright
Tracks 2 and 9 recorded and mixed by Mark Naficy
Tracks 3–8 engineered by Mike Walter
Tracks 3–8 BBC producer – Tony Wilson
Mastered by Stephen Marcussen
Art direction – Mary Maurer
Design – Mary Maurer and Brandy Flower/Happenstance
Photography by Marty Temme
Packaging concepts by Sean Kinney
Management – Susan Silver

Chart positions

Album

Singles

References

Albums produced by Tony Wilson
Alice in Chains albums
2000 live albums
Live grunge albums
Columbia Records live albums